"Along Comes Mary" is a song composed by Tandyn Almer, originally recorded by American sunshine pop band the Association. It was the group's first hit, released in March 1966 as the lead single prior to their debut album, And Then... Along Comes the Association, which appeared in July.

Background
"Along Comes Mary" is sung from the point of view of a once-disillusioned young man talking about the "tribulations no one ever sees" and who "curse[s] those faults in me." The singer believes Mary gives him comfort and improves his life. An acquaintance of Almer claimed in an interview that "Mary" refers to marijuana, though it is unclear if Almer ever confirmed this. In the Young People's Concert titled What Is a Mode? Leonard Bernstein explained that the song was composed in the Dorian mode.

Charts

Bloodhound Gang version

American rock band Bloodhound Gang recorded a version of "Along Comes Mary" with new punk music to accompany the lyrics. It first appeared on the 1998 soundtrack to the film Half Baked before appearing on Bloodhound Gang's third studio album, Hooray for Boobies, the following year. "Along Comes Mary" was released as the album's first single in May 1999 and reached  5 in Austria, No. 6 in Germany, and No. 13 in Switzerland. The song was certified gold in both Austria and Germany.

Charts

Weekly charts

Year-end charts

Certifications

Other covers
In 1966, Hugh Masekela included the song on his album Hugh Masekela's Next Album, and in 1967, Cal Tjader covered it for his album Along Comes Cal. That same year, Baja Marimba Band's had a minor hit with their cover of the song. In 1968, George Benson included a version on his album Giblet Gravy, and in 1986 a cover appeared on R. Stevie Moore's album Glad Music. In 1995, the Manhattan Transfer covered the song for their album Tonin', and the following year, 24-7 Spyz covered it for their album 6. In 2005, a cover of the song appeared on the Guess Who's compilation album Let's Go, and Plainsong also released a cover on their self-titled album.

See also
 List of recordings of songs Hal Blaine has played on

References

1966 singles
1966 songs
1997 singles
The Association songs
Bloodhound Gang songs
Geffen Records singles
Songs about cannabis
Songs written by Tandyn Almer
Valiant Records singles